A killing field is a concept in military science.

Killing field may also refer to:

 Killing Fields, a number of sites in Cambodia where collectively more than a million people were killed and buried by the Khmer Rouge regime, during its rule of the country from 1975 to 1979
 Texas Killing Fields, a location in Texas that is the scene of 30+ murders, mostly unsolved

Media
 The Killing Fields (film), a 1984 drama about the Cambodian Killing Fields
 The Killing Fields (soundtrack), by Mike Oldfield, a soundtrack album to the film
 The Killing Fields: The Facts Behind the Film, a book by Sydney Schanberg
 Sri Lanka's Killing Fields, a 2011 documentary
 Sri Lanka's Killing Fields: War Crimes Unpunished, a 2012 documentary
 The Killing Field, a 2014 mystery-drama-thriller television film
 Texas Killing Fields (film), a 2011 detective thriller film set in Texas, USA
 Killing Fields, a documentary television series about a murder investigation, airing on the cable network Investigation Discovery
 Killing Field (film), a 2018 Burmese action-thriller film
 Crime Scene: The Texas Killing Fields, a 2022 documentary miniseries about the Texas Killing Fields

Music
 Killing Fields (album), by the Molemen
 "The Killing Field", a song by The Pillows on the album Living Field
 "The Killing Fields", a song by Insane Clown Posse on the album Riddle Box
 "Killing Fields", a song by Slayer on the album Divine Intervention

Other uses
 Killing vector field,  a concept in mathematics